1,3-Dehydroadamantane, formally tetracyclo[3.3.1.13,7.01,3]decane, is an organic compound with formula C10H14, which can be obtained from adamantane by removal of two hydrogen atoms to create an internal bond.  It is a polycyclic hydrocarbon, and can be viewed also as being derived from [3.3.1]propellane by addition of a methylene bridge between the two larger rings.

Like other small-ring propellanes, this compound is substantially strained and unstable.

Synthesis
1,3-Dehydroadamantane was obtained in 1969 by Richard Pincock and Edward Torupka, by reduction of 1,3-dibromoadamantane according to the scheme below:

Reactions

Oxidation 
On standing in solution, it reacts with oxygen from air (with a half-life of 6 hours), yielding a peroxide.  The latter converts to a dihydroxide by reaction with lithium aluminium hydride.

Polymerization 
Like [1.1.1]propellane, 1,3-dehydroadamantane can be polymerized by breaking the axial bond and joining the resulting radicals into a linear chain:

In this scheme, 1,3-dehydroadamantane is reacted with acrylonitrile in a radical polymerization initiated with lithium metal in tetrahydrofuran. The resulting alternating copolymer has a glass transition temperature of 217 °C

See also
 [1.1.1]Propellane
 [2.2.2]Propellane

References

Adamantanes
Cyclopropanes